Fernando Villalón (born 18 March 1963) is a Spanish equestrian. He competed in two events at the 1992 Summer Olympics.

References

External links
 

1963 births
Living people
Spanish male equestrians
Olympic equestrians of Spain
Equestrians at the 1992 Summer Olympics
Sportspeople from Madrid